Kara-Suu is a village in Toktogul District, Jalal-Abad Region of Kyrgyzstan. Its population was 1,770 in 2021.

References
 

Populated places in Jalal-Abad Region